The 1937 Australian Grand Prix is a name which has been applied retrospectively to the 1936 South Australian Centenary Grand Prix, a motor race held on the Port Elliot-Victor Harbor road circuit in South Australia on Boxing Day, 26 December 1936.

The 1935 Australian Grand Prix had been held at Phillip Island in April and no succeeding event had been planned. Eventually the Australian Grand Prix would be revived in April 1938 at Bathurst. The stature of 1936 South Australian Centenary Grand Prix, the largest such race held in the three-year gap, saw it later renamed and redated to become the 1937 Australian Grand Prix.

The race was the first road race for cars to be held in South Australia, with special amendments to the Road Traffic Act required to allow the roads to be closed for that purpose. A 7.8-mile (12.55 km) course was laid out specifically for the race on sealed public roads between the seaside towns of Port Elliot and Victor Harbor. It was only used for racing on this one occasion. The race, which had 27 starters, was held over 32 laps for a total distance of approximately 250 miles (400 kilometres). Like most major Australian motor races of the period, it featured a handicap start, with the slowest cars starting first and other cars starting at timed intervals according to their predicted performance. The race was organised by the Sporting Car Club of South Australia and promoted by Centenary Road Races Limited of Adelaide. It was open to factory built and catalogued racing cars and sports cars, irrespective of engine capacity, however other entries not meeting that description were also considered.

The race was won by pre-race favourite Les Murphy, driving a MG P-type off a handicap of 40 minutes. He finished over ten minutes clear of Tim Joshua driving a similar car with Bob Lea-Wright third in a Terraplane-based special. Fifth placed finisher Ossie Cranston, driving a Ford V8-based special off a handicap of 5 minutes, completed the race in the fastest actual running time of 3 hours 20 minutes and 17 seconds.

Classification 

Results as follows.

The entries of McDonald, Anderson and Abbott were "flagged off", having exceeded the time limit rule.

Notes
Winner's average speed:

References

External links
 Grand Prix won at 68½ mph, The Mail, Adelaide, 26 December 1936, trove.nla.gov.au

Grand Prix
Australian Grand Prix
Australian Grand Prix